Horton is a village and civil parish in Berkshire, England. It is between Windsor and Staines-upon-Thames.

History and etymology
The village name is a common one in England. It is Old English in origin and derives from the two words horu 'dirt' and tūn 'settlement, farm, estate', presumably meaning 'farm on muddy soil'. In the Domesday Book of 1086 it was recorded as Hortune. The Horton Manor was assessed at 10 hides and held by Walter son of Other.

Geography
Through the Horton parish flows the Colne Brook which runs to the River Thames from the River Colne.  railway station is nearest to its southern end, and  railway station is nearest to its western end. Heathrow airport is to its east. Horton has a local nature reserve, the Arthur Jacob Nature Reserve.

Parish church
The Church of England parish church of St Michael has a 12th-century nave, with an ornate Norman arch over the north door in the porch. The north transept is 15th century and the square bell-tower is late 16th century. The aisle, chancel and vestry were rebuilt in 1875–76. The exterior of the church is chequered with brickwork, limestone and flint. It has a clock, and the ring of bells was augmented from five to six in 1987.

Governance
Horton was transferred from Buckinghamshire to Berkshire in 1974. At parish level the village is represented by nine councillors of the Horton Parish Council. At borough level the town is part of the Datchet Horton and Wraysbury electoral ward and is currently represented by three councillors, David Cannon (Conservative), Ewan Larcombe (independent) and Gary Muir (Conservative), in the Royal Borough of Windsor and Maidenhead.  Nationally, since 1997 the ward has formed part of the UK Parliamentary constituency of Windsor, which has been represented since 2005 by Adam Afriyie of the Conservative Party. Before 1997 the town was part of the UK Parliamentary constituency of Windsor and Maidenhead which was consistently held by the Conservative Party.

Notable residents
John Milton the English poet is one of the more famous former residents of Horton. His family rented Berkyn Manor, a house that belonged to Sir John Egerton, in the parish between 1632 and 1640. The chancel of St Michael's parish church contains the grave of Milton's mother Sara; and a 19th-century stained glass window on the church commemorates Milton's poem Paradise Lost. The current Berkyn Manor was rebuilt in 1848 by Edward Tyrrell (Remembrancer of the City of London) reputedly on the site of Milton's house.

Gallery

External links

St Michael's Horton
Horton Parish Council

References

Civil parishes in Berkshire
Villages in Berkshire
Royal Borough of Windsor and Maidenhead